Maun Senior Secondary School is a government-run boarding school located in Maun, Botswana, the fifth largest town in Botswana. It was the first secondary school in the district.

History
Missionaries from the United Congregation Church of Southern Africa founded the school in 1970. The first class contained 70 students. In 2017, 2,000 students attended the school.

The school admitted its first deaf students in 2004.

In 2012, a fire damaged several school classrooms, including the original classroom built in 1970. The fires were allegedly set by students to force the administration to fire male teachers who were engaging in relations with female students.

The Maun tourism industry has led to recent reforms to allow Maun Secondary students to get careers in hospitality and tourism.

Athletics
Maun Secondary has traditionally performed well at the Botswana Independent Sports Association finals, winning 31 medals in 2019 and several of its students have set national records at the finals event.

See also 

 Education in Botswana

References

Schools in Botswana